The Los Angeles Times Book Prize for Young Adult Novel, established in 1998, is a category of the Los Angeles Times Book Prize. Works are eligible during the year of their first US publication in English, though they may be written originally in languages other than English.

Recipients

References 

English-language literary awards
20th-century literary awards
21st-century literary awards
International literary awards
Awards established in 1998
20th-century children's literature
21st-century children's literature